David Porter (born November 21, 1941) is an American record producer, songwriter, singer, entrepreneur and philanthropist.

Porter was a 2005 inductee into the Songwriters Hall of Fame, with catalog sales exceeding 400 million units. In 2015, Rolling Stone listed him among the 100 Greatest Songwriters of All Time. He is best known for songwriting, having written Sam & Dave's "Soul Man" (1968 Grammy winner), and "Hold On, I'm Comin'". His songs have been sampled in Mariah Carey's "Dreamlover" (1993 Grammy winner), and Will Smith's "Gettin' Jiggy wit It" (1999 Grammy winner).

He is also the founder of the Memphis-based Consortium MMT, a nonprofit organization seeking to develop the music industry in Memphis.

Porter has over 1,700 songwriter and composer credits for a range of artists, including Aretha Franklin, James Brown, Celine Dion, Otis Redding, Drake, ZZ Top, Tom Jones, Ted Nugent, Bonnie Raitt, Wu-Tang Clan, Eminem, Patsy Cline, Albert King and Eurythmics.

Biography

Early life
Porter was the ninth of 12 children born to James and Corean Porter in Memphis, his second oldest brother was COGIC Bishop W. L. Porter (1925–2009). Porter's career began in music after singing in church, school, Memphis venues and competitions, often with close friend and classmate Maurice White, who later founded Earth, Wind and Fire. Porter graduated from Booker T. Washington High in 1961 and later attended LeMoyne College. While still a high-school student working at a grocery across from Satellite Records, he went over to find if the label would consider recording soul music. 

After meetings with Chips Moman, Porter became active at Satellite as a songwriter. With this role, Porter arranged for his friends and classmates to record for the Satellite label, including Booker T. Jones, William Bell, and Andrew Love. Soon after, Satellite rebranded as Stax Records and redefined their focus to become a soul music label.

Stax career

Porter was the first staff songwriter at Stax Records and developed his skills in A&R and songwriting. In Porter's A&R capacity, he signed acts including The Emotions, Homer Banks, The Soul Children and was a catalyst for bringing in Isaac Hayes as a writing partner. As house composers for Stax Records, Porter and Hayes penned most of Sam & Dave's hits, including "Soul Man", "I Thank You", "When Something Is Wrong with My Baby" and "Hold On, I'm Comin'". They also wrote material for Carla Thomas ("B-A-B-Y"), Johnnie Taylor ("I Got to Love Somebody's Baby" and "I Had a Dream"), and The Soul Children. Starting in the late 1960s, Hayes became increasingly focused on his own recording career, eventually leading to the end of the songwriting partnership. The Hayes-Porter duo composed 200 songs during their collaboration.

Porter then began recording his own albums for Stax. He did a single for Stax itself in 1965, "Can't See You When I Want To", a remake of which became a Top 30 R&B hit for Porter.  He cut several albums for Stax in the early 1970s, including a concept LP, Victim of the Joke? which includes an upbeat cover of The Beatles' "Help!".  Also, he released on other labels under the pseudonyms Little David and Kenny Cain.

Porter began working with songwriting partner Ronnie Williams, and later went on to engineer the brief relaunch of the Stax label in 1978, after the bankrupt label's assets were acquired by Fantasy Records. He and Hayes received Pioneer Awards from the Rhythm and Blues Foundation in 1999.

Songwriters Hall of Fame
On June 9, 2005, Porter was inducted into the Songwriters Hall of Fame alongside Bill Withers, Steve Cropper, Robert B. Sherman, Richard M. Sherman, John Fogerty, and his longtime writing partner Isaac Hayes.

The Consortium MMT
In 2012, Porter founded The Consortium MMT, a 501(c) non-profit with the goal of developing a viable music industry in Memphis through structured teaching, experience and mentorship. Porter was awarded the 2013 Governor's Arts Award for his achievements including the founding and success of The Consortium MMT venture.

Awards, honors and positions

Awards and honors

Songwriters Hall of Fame Inductee
Rolling Stone 100 Greatest Songwriters of All Time
Mr. David Porter Street honorary in Memphis, Tennessee
Grammy Awards and Nominations (various, over a 50-year span)
RIAA Certified One-Million Sales Award, Soul Man by Sam & Dave
Broadcast Music, Inc., Citation of Achievement 1969, Soul Man
Broadcast Music, Inc., Citation of Achievement, Dreamlover 1st Award
Broadcast Music, Inc., Citation of Achievement, Dreamlover 2nd Award
Broadcast Music, Inc., Citation of Achievement, Gettin' Jiggy Wit It
Broadcast Music, Inc., Pop Award
Rhythm and Blues "Pioneer Award" Winner, 1999
The University of Memphis "Distinguished Achievement Award" In the Creative and Performing Arts, 1992
The University of Memphis Board of Trustees Award, 2008
The National Academy of Recording Arts and Sciences Award of Appreciation
2013 Governor's Arts Award (awarded on basis of arts achievements and work with the Consortium MMT)

Boards, commissions and entrepreneurship

Chapter President and National Trustee, The National Academy of Recording Arts and Sciences
Chairman, Memphis/Shelby County Film, Tape and Music Commission
Member of the Board, Youth Villages
Trustee, University of Memphis Board of Visitors
Member of the Board, State of Tennessee Film/Music Commission
Member of the Board, TPC annual PGA golf event benefiting St. Jude Hospital
Member of the Board, Orpheum Theatre (Memphis)
Member of the Board, Memphis State Music Advisory Board
Director, Bank of Bartlett
Owner, Da Blues (blues club) at Memphis International Airport
Owner, IPR Records
Owner, Robosac Music, LLC (music publishing company)
Investor, Xsite (Memphis, Little Rock)
Investor/Partner B.B. Kings Blues Club (Memphis, Los Angeles)

Stax-era discography (1965–74)

Songwriting and production with Isaac Hayes
1965: "Candy", by the Astors
1965: "You Don't Know Like I Know", by Sam & Dave
1966: "Let Me Be Good to You", by Carla Thomas
1966: "B-A-B-Y", by Carla Thomas
1966: "Your Good Thing (Is About to End)", by Mabel John
1966: "Hold On, I'm Comin'", by Sam & Dave
1967: "When Something is Wrong with My Baby", by Sam & Dave
1967: "Soul Man", by Sam & Dave
1968: "I Thank You", by Sam & Dave
1969: "So I Can Love You", by The Emotions (production only)
1969: "The Sweeter He Is", by The Soul Children
1969: "Soul Sister Brown Sugar", by Sam & Dave

Albums
All albums issued on Stax Records' Enterprise label.
1970: Gritty, Groovy, & Gettin' It
1971: ...Into a Real Thing
1973: Victim of the Joke? An Opera
1974: Sweat & Love

Singles
All singles issued on Stax Records' Enterprise label unless otherwise noted.
1965: "Can't See You When I Want To" b/w "Win You Over" (Stax)
1970: "One Part Love, Two Parts Pain" b/w "Can't See You When I Want To"
1971: "If I Give It Up, I Want It Back [Pt. I]" b/w "If I Give It Up, I Want It Back [Pt. II]"
1972: "Ain't That Loving You (for More Reasons Than One)" b/w "Baby I'm-a Want You" (with Isaac Hayes)
1972: "I'm Afraid the Masquerade Is Over" b/w "Hang On Sloopy"
1972: "When the Chips Are Down" b/w "I Wanna Be Your Somebody"
1973: "Long as You're the One Somebody in the World" b/w "When You Have to Sneak, You Have to Sneak"
1974: "I Got You and I'm Glad" b/w "Falling Out, Falling In"

References

External links

1941 births
Living people
American funk musicians
American soul musicians
Musicians from Memphis, Tennessee
Stax Records artists